CD30, also known as TNFRSF8 (TNF receptor superfamily member 8), is a cell membrane protein of  the tumor necrosis factor receptor family and a tumor marker.

Function 

This receptor is expressed by activated, but not by resting, T and B cells. TRAF2 and TRAF5 can interact with this receptor, and mediate the signal transduction that leads to the activation of NF-kappaB. It is a positive regulator of apoptosis, and also has been shown to limit the proliferative potential of autoreactive CD8 effector T cells and protect the body against autoimmunity. Two alternatively spliced transcript variants of this gene encoding distinct isoforms have been reported.

Clinical significance 

CD30 is associated with anaplastic large cell lymphoma. It is expressed in embryonal carcinoma but not in seminoma and is thus a useful marker in distinguishing between these germ cell tumors. CD30 and CD15 are also expressed on Reed-Sternberg cells typical for Hodgkin's lymphoma.

Cancer treatment 

CD30 is the target of the FDA approved therapeutic brentuximab vedotin (Adcetris).  It is approved for use in:
 Hodgkin lymphoma (HL) (brentuximab vedotin) after failure of autologous stem cell transplant (ASCT)
 HL in patients who are not ASCT candidates after failure of at least 2 multiagent chemotherapy regimens
 Systemic anaplastic large cell lymphoma (sALCL) after failure of at least 1 multiagent chemotherapy regimen
 Primary cutaneous anaplastic large cell lymphoma (pcALCL) or CD30-expressing mycosis fungoides (MF) who have received prior systemic therapy

Brentuximab vedotin is also currently being studied in and recommended for treating:
 Various types of CD30-positive B cell lymphomas
Various types of CD30-positive T cell lymphomas
 CD30-positive cases of the NK cell lymphoma, extranodal NK/T-cell lymphoma, nasal type

Interactions 

CD30 has been shown to interact with TRAF5, and TRAF2.

References

Further reading

External links